Real de Arteaga Fútbol Club is a Mexican professional football team based in Querétaro City, Querétaro, Mexico that plays in Liga Premier de México.

History
The team was founded in May 2022 to be registered in the Liga Premier. On July 1, 2022, the team's entry into the league was officially announced, being placed in the Serie A de México.

After confirming his entry, the team announced Pablo Robles as the team's first coach. The team announced its intention to settle for young people from schools in the city in addition to establishing an agreement with Real Betis.

Stadium

The Estadio Olímpico de Querétaro, also called Estadio Olímpico Alameda, is a multi-use stadium in Querétaro City, Querétaro, Mexico.  It is currently used mostly for football matches and athletics. The stadium has a capacity of 4,600 people, was opened in 1939 and renovated in 2021.

Players

First-team squad

External Links 
Liga MX Profile

References 

Football clubs in Querétaro
Association football clubs established in 2022
2022 establishments in Mexico
Liga Premier de México